Augusto Jorge Mateo Solari (born 3 January 1992) is an Argentine professional footballer who plays for RC Celta de Vigo as a winger.

Career
Born in Rosario, Solari began his career at River Plate and was a member of the sides that won the 2013–14 Primera División, 2014 Copa Sudamericana and 2015 Copa Libertadores titles, among others. He scored his only goal for La Banda on 29 March 2015 in a 3–2 win at Gimnasia de La Plata.

At the end of 2015, Solari was loaned for a year to Nelson Vivas' Estudiantes de La Plata. In February 2017, this agreement was extended for a further year. On 25 May he scored the only goal of a home win over Botafogo in the Copa Libertadores group stage, though the team did not advance.

In July 2017, Solari transferred to Racing Club on a four-year deal, after being removed from Marcelo Gallardo's plans. The following 6 May, on his return to Estudiantes, he was sent off after 39 minutes of a 2–1 win. He added another league title to his tally in 2018–19; he contributed a career-best five goals to their campaign.

On 23 January 2021, Solari joined La Liga club RC Celta de Vigo on a 2-year deal. He was signed by his former Racing manager Eduardo Coudet, for a fee of €500,000. He made his debut on 1 February in a goalless draw at Granada CF, replacing Nolito after an hour. His first goal concluded a 2–0 home win over Levante UD, nine minutes after coming on for fellow scorer Brais Méndez.

Personal life
Solari comes from a footballing background — his grandfather is Jorge Solari and he is a cousin of brothers Santiago, Esteban and David.

Career statistics

Honours
River Plate
Copa Libertadores: 2015
Copa Sudamericana: 2014
Argentine Primera División: Final 2013–14, Superfinal 2013–14
J.League Cup / Copa Sudamericana Championship: 2015
Supercopa Euroamericana: 2015
U-20 Copa Libertadores: 2012

Racing Club
Argentine Primera División: 2018–19

References

External links

1992 births
Living people
Footballers from Rosario, Santa Fe
Argentine footballers
Association football midfielders
Argentine Primera División players
Club Atlético River Plate footballers
Estudiantes de La Plata footballers
Racing Club de Avellaneda footballers
RC Celta de Vigo players
La Liga players
Argentine expatriate footballers
Argentine expatriate sportspeople in Spain
Expatriate footballers in Spain